NF3 may refer to:
 Nitrogen trifluoride (NF3), a colorless gas used as an etchant
 Zukertort Opening, an opening move in chess (1. Nf3)